Xi'anmen Station, formerly Yixianqiao station during planning until 2007, is a station of Line 2 of the Nanjing Metro. It is named after the former gate known as Xi'anmen of the Ming Palace, and started operations on 28 May 2010 along with the rest of Line 2.

Around the station
 Nanjing General Hospital of Nanjing Military Command

References

Railway stations in Jiangsu
Railway stations in China opened in 2010
Nanjing Metro stations